Sophronica rufuloides is a species of beetle in the family Cerambycidae. It was described by Lepesme and Stephan von Breuning in 1951.

References

Sophronica
Beetles described in 1951